Jrvezh, meaning "waterfall", is a major village in the Kotayk Province of Armenia, located at the eastern outskirts of the capital Yerevan. The village is 45 km south of the provincial capital Hrazdan, and 9 km from the town of Abovyan.

The name of the village appeared for the first time in history during the 5th century by historian Ghazar Parpetsi.

The village is home to many historical sites including the remains of 2 chapels dating back to the 7th and 13th centuries respectively.

The present-day Surp Katoghike church of Jrvezh was opened in 1891.

As of the 2011 census, the population of the village is 7,198.

Gallery

See also 
Kotayk Province

References

Populated places in Kotayk Province
Yazidi populated places in Armenia